is an action game for the PlayStation. It was released only in Japan.

References

External links 
 

M
1997 video games
Action video games
Japan-exclusive video games
PlayStation (console) games
PlayStation (console)-only games
Video games developed in Japan